John Northampton (died 1361) was a Canon of Windsor from 1352 to 1355.

Career

He was appointed:
Attorney in England of the Abbot of Cluny, Audrouin de La Roche, 1355
Purveyor of the Buttery 1361

He was appointed to the eleventh stall in St George's Chapel, Windsor Castle in 1352 and held the canonry until 1355.

Notes 

1361 deaths
Canons of Windsor
Year of birth unknown